Ryan Kennedy (born December 6, 1982) is a Canadian actor and model. He is best known for his role "Travis Hollier" in the 2006 TV series Whistler and "Jake Harrow" in The CW 2010 TV series Hellcats. Kennedy has also played Apollo 11 astronaut Michael Collins in the Apple TV+ original science fiction space drama series For All Mankind.

Personal life
Ryan Kennedy was born in Winnipeg, Manitoba, and reared in Oakbank. He has two younger brothers, Adam and Micah.

Kennedy graduated from Springs Christian Academy in Winnipeg.

Filmography

Films

Television

References

External links

1982 births
Living people
Male actors from Winnipeg
Canadian male television actors
Canadian male film actors